This is a list of films which have placed number one at the weekend box office in the United Kingdom during 1999.

References

See also 
 List of British films – British films by year
 Lists of box office number-one films

1999
United Kingdom
Box office number-one films